Simon Blaszczak (born August 20, 1983) is a former professional Canadian football wide receiver. He went undrafted in the 2009 CFL Draft. He played CIS football for the Manitoba Bisons.

Blaszczak was also a member of the Winnipeg Blue Bombers but was cut following training camp and returned to college.

External links 
Manitoba Bisons bio

1983 births
Living people
Canadian football slotbacks
Manitoba Bisons football players
Players of Canadian football from Manitoba
Canadian football people from Winnipeg
Winnipeg Blue Bombers players